"Highway Patrolman" is a song written and recorded by Bruce Springsteen and was first released as the fifth track on his 1982 album Nebraska.

The song tells the story of Joe Roberts, the highway patrolman of the title from whose viewpoint the song is written and his brother, Frankie, and is set in the 1960s. Frankie is portrayed as unruly and frequently causing and encountering trouble, while Joe is the more mature and sensible brother who always comes to his aid.

In 1965, Frankie joins the United States Army (and presumably is sent to Vietnam, though this is not made explicit), while Joe takes a farm deferment and marries a girl called Maria (who, it is implied, had attracted the attentions of both brothers). Within three years however, falling wheat prices cause Joe to leave the farm and take a job as a highway patrolman. Meanwhile, in 1968, Frankie leaves the army and returns home. One night, Joe receives a call and visits a bar where a boy has been attacked and appears to be in a serious condition ("on the floor looking bad, bleeding hard from his head"), with a witness ("a girl crying at a table") identifying his attacker as Frankie, who has fled. Joe chases Frankie through rural Michigan until they reach - and Frankie crosses - the Canada–US border, the implication being that Joe has allowed him to escape; as the lyrics suggest, "when it's your brother, sometimes you look the other way" and "I pulled over the side of the highway and watched his tail lights disappear."

Like the rest of the album, the song was recorded on Springsteen's four-track cassette recorder with the intention of it being performed for the album with his full band; however, it was felt that the demo version of the song was superior to the eventual 'band cut' and was released on the album in its original form. It features the same stark, bleak atmosphere as the other songs on the album, and it consists of only vocals, very quiet harmonica and acoustic guitar.

Springsteen featured the song only once on the "American Land" leg of his critically acclaimed tour with the Seeger Sessions band, and the version is featured on the 2007 release Bruce Springsteen with The Sessions Band: Live in Dublin. This version was praised by Rolling Stone critic Andy Greene as the "fantastic, maybe definitive" version of the song.

Artistic licenses

Like many creative writers, Springsteen creates a time and place that people can relate to but that may not necessarily exist:
 The lyrics say Joe is "a sergeant out of Perrineville." The only American city with that name is Perrineville, New Jersey. There is, however, an unincorporated community called Perronville in Harris Township, Michigan.
 While the lyrics state, "I must have done a hundred and ten through Michigan county that night," there is no Michigan County anywhere in the United States.
 There is no land border between Michigan and Canada as the song suggests.  (There are, however, many bridges and other water crossings between Michigan and Canada.  Many road signs in New Jersey say, "New York City, 5 miles".  But, there is no land border between New Jersey and NYC, as those signs appear to suggest...  to some.)
 The refrain mentions a song called "The Night of the Johnstown Flood," but the tune is probably fictitious. In the years after the Springsteen song was released, several groups would record songs with that title.

Legacy
Sean Penn based the screenplay of his 1991 directorial debut The Indian Runner on the song's story. Penn also directed a music video of the song that appeared on 2001 reissue of Video Anthology / 1978-88.

The song was covered by Johnny Cash on his 1983 album Johnny 99. The title track of the album is also a Springsteen song originally released on the album Nebraska.

Dar Williams performed "Highway Patrolman" on Badlands - A Tribute to Bruce Springsteen's Nebraska.

Whitey Morgan covered this song on his 2014 album Grandpa's Guitar.

Croatian writer Jurica Pavičić was inspired by the song to write an eponymous novel about two brothers. Croatian Television made it into a 5-episodes TV Show Patrola na cesti (Highway Patrol) in 2015/16.

Personnel
According to authors Philippe Margotin and Jean-Michel Guesdon:

Bruce Springsteen – vocals, guitar, harmonica, mandolin

References

External links 
 Lyrics & Audio clips from Brucespringsteen.net
 Rollingstone
 http://whiteymorgan.com/

1982 songs
Bruce Springsteen songs
Songs written by Bruce Springsteen
Song recordings produced by Bruce Springsteen
Songs about siblings